Dame Pieter Ane Stewart  is a New Zealand businesswoman. In the 1980s, she established her own promotions company and modelling agency, and was the associate editor of New Zealand Fashion Quarterly from 1985 to 1987. 

She founded New Zealand Fashion Week in 2000. In the 2012 Queen's Birthday and Diamond Jubilee Honours, she was appointed a Dame Companion of the New Zealand Order of Merit, for services to fashion and the community.

References

Year of birth missing (living people)
Living people
20th-century New Zealand businesswomen
20th-century New Zealand businesspeople
New Zealand editors
New Zealand magazine editors
Women magazine editors
Dames Companion of the New Zealand Order of Merit
21st-century New Zealand businesswomen
21st-century New Zealand businesspeople